Treiso is a comune (municipality) in the Province of Cuneo in the Italian region Piedmont, located about  southeast of Turin and about 50 kilometres northeast of Cuneo.

Treiso borders the following municipalities: Alba, Barbaresco, Neive, Neviglie, and Trezzo Tinella.

Demographic evolution

References

Cities and towns in Piedmont